Sara Naveed is a Pakistani author based in Lahore, Pakistan.

Biography 

Sara Naveed concluded her master's degree with a Gold Medal in Banking and Finance from University of Management and Technology, Lahore.

After completing her matriculation degree from Convent of Jesus and Mary, Sialkot, she opted for pre-medical, but ended up graduating in business. Published in November 2014, Undying Affinity is her debut romance novel.

Her second novel, titled Our Story Ends Here, published by Penguin Random House India, came out on 14 February 2017.

Work 
 Undying Affinity
 Our Story Ends Here 
All of My Heart

The World Between Us

References

External links 
 Official Website

Pakistani women writers
People from Sialkot
Writers from Lahore
Living people
Women writers from Punjab, Pakistan
Year of birth missing (living people)